Achnashellach Forest (Scottish Gaelic: Ach nan Seileach field of the willows) is a large area of the Scottish Highlands lying between Glen Carron and Loch Monar.

It is accessible from the A890 road, which runs through it and from Achnashellach railway station.

External links 
Website for visitors to the forest

References

Geography of Highland (council area)
Forests and woodlands of Scotland